Romy Haag (born Edouard Frans Verba; 1 January 1948) is a Dutch dancer, singer, actress and former nightclub manager.

Early life
When she was 13, Romy Haag and her family joined the circus. She started her career at the Circus Strassburger as a children's clown. At age 16, she moved to Paris with the trapeze artists from the circus and debuted at the Parisian nightclub Alcazar as a cabaret dancer.

Career
In 1972, an American show manager offered Haag a tour booking and she performed her show "Berlin Chanson" at Fire Island, in Long Island and Atlantic City. There she met and fell in love with a street musician from Berlin and decided to move back to Europe to live in the German city with him.

In 1974, at age 26, she opened her own cabaret, named Chez Romy Haag, in Berlin-Schöneberg. Visitors to the venue included Udo Lindenberg, Zizi Jeanmaire, Patricia Highsmith, Bryan Ferry, Tina Turner, Horst Buchholz, Grace Jones, Rainer Werner Fassbinder, Iggy Pop, Freddie Mercury, Lou Reed and Mick Jagger, whom she first met in 1973. In 1976, Haag and David Bowie began a romantic relationship; Bowie subsequently moved to Berlin and completed his first German tour.

Her first single "Liege-Samba" appeared in 1977, with Udo Lindenberg contributing the lyrics and music. She went on tour with Lindenberg, and in the following year, released her single "Superparadise". In 1979, the New Yorker Profile Gallery profiled her in a photo tribute. In 1981, her first album So bin ich, with Klaus Hoffmann contributing the lyrics, was released.

After nine years, in 1983, she sold her night club to travel the world. Returning to Germany in 1986, she began touring Germany, Austria, Switzerland and the U.S. with her "City in the Night" show. During mid 1980s, Haag was featured in the video installation "Queen Zero", an art performance in the New York Museum of Modern Art.

In 1999, her autobiography Eine Frau und mehr was published. Haag describes her life, the art scene in the U.S., and Berlin in the 1970s.

In 2010, she had a role as a receptionist in the internet soap opera Doc Love playing alongside Dieter Bach, Oliver Bender and Ellenie Salvo González.

During her career, she performed with Conny Göckel, Alexander Kraut, Lutz Woite, Friedel Schwarz, Erik Küppers, Blacky Schwarz, Roland Götz, Hansi Wallbaum, Uli Moritz, Eberhardt Fortmann.

She has had roles in 26 films, including Plastikfieber, The Hamburg Syndrome and Mascara with Charlotte Rampling. She released 17 albums.

Honors and awards
In 1997 Haag received the Teddy Award at the Berlinale 1997 for her life work. The Teddy Award is awarded in recognition of films with LGBTQIA topics.

The German astronomer Felix Hormuth named one of the minor planets he discovered on 29 January 2009 after Romy Haag. The asteroid is officially named 305660 Romyhaag.

Discography

Albums
 1977: Tell! cast recording (With Su Kramer, Jürgen Drews, Udo Lindenberg, Jackie Carter, Alexis Korner) (Telefunken)
 1981: So bin Ich (Aladin)
 1983: Flugblatt (Risiko)
 1985: City in the Night (Constant)
 1990: Live – Rock n Roll Bitch (1980–1990) (Black-Heart)
 1992: Live – Leben ist gleich Karneval (Black-Heart)
 1993: On the Road Again – Chaos in Einheit Tour (Black-Heart)
 1996: In Concert – Hexenkessel (Black-Heart)
 1999: Cabaret Berlin (Ricca)
 2001: Balladen für Huren und Engel (Ricca)
 2003: Reichtum Chill-Inn-Music (Kraut)
 2005: Frauen, die ich nicht vergessen kann – Live (Kraut)
 2010: Moving On (Fpr Music)

Singles
 1977: "Liege-Samba" (Telefunken)
 1978: "Superparadise" (Philips)
 1979: "Showtime" (Philips)
 1979: "Catch Me" (Aladin / EMI Electrola)
 1983: "Rosen Im Schnee" (Aladin)
 1983: "Non Je Ne Regrette Rien" (Risiko)
 1985: "In Der Nacht Ist Der Mensch Nicht Gern Alleine" (Constant)
 1987: "Help Me Make It Through the Night" (EMI)
 1990: "Süße Kirschen" – Lyric Expedition Featuring Romy Haag (Teldec)
 1994: "Toujours Retour" (Ricca)
 2001: "La Vie En Rose" (Monopol)
 2002: "Memories Are Made of This" (Pool)
 2012: "Love Will Find a Way" – Romy Haag with Marion Gold (Bon Voyage)
 2012: "Let's Dance" – Part of the Art Featuring Romy Haag (N/A)
 2014: "Wunder Gibt Es Nur Im Märchen" (Donato Plögert Musik)

Filmography 
 1987: Ossegg oder Die Wahrheit über Hänsel und Gretel
 1987: Mascara, Director: Patrick Conrad
 1988: 
 2014: Laura – Das Juwel von Stuttgart, Director: Rosa von Praunheim

Radio 
 1978: Anthony J. Ingrassia: Berührungen – Director: Götz Naleppa (Hörspiel (Kunstkopf) – RIAS Berlin/NDR)

Publications 
 (de) Eine Frau und mehr, Romy Haag, 1999, Quadriga.

References

External links

 
 Official website 
 Die Welt: Jochen Breiholz: Wie Onassis sich Romy angelte, 8 September 1999.
 Buskeismus

1948 births
Entertainers from The Hague
Living people
Transgender singers
Transgender actresses
Dutch pop singers
Dutch women singers
Dutch LGBT singers
Nightclub managers
Transgender women musicians